Maori chief may refer to:

Rangatira, a hereditary chieftain in Māori culture
Notothenia angustata, a species of fish often referred to by the common name "Maori chief"
Paranotothenia magellanica, a species of fish infrequently referred to by the common name "Maori chief"